Ningyuan Subdistrict is a subdistrict located in the center of Hebei District, Tianjin, China. It borders Tiedong Road Subdistrict in the northwest, Jianchang Avenue Subdistrict in the northeast, Wangchuanchang Subdistrict in the southeast, as well as Wanghailou and Hongshunli Subdistricts in the southwest. The census counted 47,253 residents for this subdistrict in 2010.

The subdistrict was established in 1954. Its name Ningyuan is referring to Beining Park that was first founded here in 1931.

Geography 
Ningyuan subdistrict is on the southeast of Xinkai River.

Administrative divisions 
The list below contains the 6 residential communities under Ningyuan Subdistrict so far in 2021:

Gallery

References 

Township-level divisions of Tianjin
Hebei District, Tianjin